Miranda Miller (born 2 March 1990) is a Canadian downhill mountain biker. 

She was the gold medalist in the downhill event at the 2017 UCI Mountain Bike World Championships.

References

External links

1990 births
Living people
Canadian female cyclists
Downhill mountain bikers
French mountain bikers
UCI Mountain Bike World Champions (women)
People from Squamish, British Columbia
20th-century Canadian women
21st-century Canadian women